Wayne Brent is the former men's basketball head coach of the Jackson State Tigers and a former high school basketball coach and college assistant coach. He retired following the 2021-2022 season and replaced by Mo Williams.

High school coach
Brent won four state championships in six seasons with Callaway High School in Jackson, Mississippi. He also coached at and won a state championship at Provine High School. He has coached many players who have gone to the National Basketball Association and overseas.

College assistant coach
Brent was an assistant coach at the University of Mississippi for four seasons and helped the Rebels advance to the NCAA tournament three times out of his four seasons.

Head coaching record

References

Living people
Basketball coaches from Mississippi
Basketball players from Jackson, Mississippi
College men's basketball head coaches in the United States
High school basketball coaches in Mississippi
Jackson State Tigers basketball coaches
Louisiana–Monroe Warhawks men's basketball coaches
Louisiana–Monroe Warhawks men's basketball players
Ole Miss Rebels men's basketball coaches
Sportspeople from Jackson, Mississippi
Year of birth missing (living people)